This is the family tree of the House of Šubić (princes of Bribir), a Croatian noble family, from 1066 to 1456.

See also 

 House of Šubić
 House of Zrinski
 Zrinski family tree
 List of rulers of Croatia

External links 
 Šubić of Bribir family tree by Dragutin Feletar in the scientific journal "Meridijani" (Meridians)
 Šubićs, the princes of Bribir, an influential family in southeastern Europe in the Middle Ages (by Florin Curta)
 Princes of Bribir and their crucial role in Croatia after extinction of the Hungarian Arpad dynasty (by Marko Marelić)
 Šubić family, a mid point of Croatian early history (by prof. Zvonko Madunić)
 Count Mrmonja (Marmonya) Šubić of Bribir - signatory of the "Pacta conventa", an agreement concluded between King Coloman of Hungary and the Croatian nobility in 1102

Family trees
Medieval Croatian nobility